Music Farm is a music venue in Charleston, South Carolina located off of King Street. It has been open since April 1991.

History 
The ' original ' Music Farm opened in April, 1991 on East Bay Street. From his experience as a musician and as a member of a band that had toured the Southeast, Kevin Wadley wanted a venue that focused on music, not just another nightclub. Wadley originated the name and concept for Music Farm. He asked Carter McMillan to partner in the business, whose background in radio and promotion enabled them to create a dynamic nightspot which quickly became known throughout the Southeast as "the place" to hear good music.

In the summer of 1998, the Music Farm was sold to Craig Comer, Riddick Lynch and Yates Dew.

Music Farm Charleston had Phish in '91 Athens GA's Widespread Panic in '92, Virginia's Dave Matthews Band in '93, The Offspring in '94, UK's Bush in '95, Chapel Hill NC's Ben Folds Five in '95, Florida's Marilyn Manson in '96, Mighty Mighty Bosstones in '96, Weezer in '97, Cracker in '97, Florida's Creed in '98, Kid Rock in '98, Atlanta's Collective Soul in '99, P.O.D. in '99.

In the 2000s, Music Farm Charleston hosted in '00: 311, Florida's Less Than Jake, 3 Doors Down, Warren Zevon (d.2003), Toronto's Our Lady Peace, Papa Roach, Blues Traveler, Charleston's Blue Dogs; in '01: OK Go, Canada's Finger Eleven, O.A.R., Iggy Pop the "Godfather of Punk"; in '03: Umphrey's McGee, Evanescence, Zoso (Led Zeppelin tribute band); in '04: My Chemical Romance; in '05: Chicago's Chevelle, Charleston's Jump, Little Children, Lifehouse, Chapin SC's Iron & Wine, Nashville's Kings of Leon; in '06: Jonas Brothers; in '07: Charleston's Band of Horses, Switchfoot, Charlotte's Avett Brothers, New Orleans' Mutemath, Slightly Stoopid, Charleston's The Working Title; in '08: rap group Wu-Tang Clan, Seneca SC's Needtobreathe, Greenville's Nile, NYC's The Bravery, Florida's A Day to Remember; in '09: Halestorm, Charlotte's Paper Tongues, Flyleaf, Colbie Caillat; 

In 2010: Owl City, Cage the Elephant, Atlanta's Manchester Orchestra, ATL's Mastodon, Michael Franti & Spearhead, Smashing Pumpkins, Modest Mouse, Pop Evil; in '11: Plain White T's, Charleston's Shovels & Rope, Matisyahu, Awolnation; in '12: Steve Aoki, Fitz and the Tantrums, EDM DJ Kaskade, Florida's Against Me!; in '13: Savannah's Baroness, Australia's Sick Puppies, The Airborne Toxic Event; '14: Jacksonville's Yellowcard, Florida's We the Kings, Boston's Dropkick Murphys, and Grouplove

In 2022, Charleston's Susto (band), Charleston's Shovels & Rope, Charleston's Stop Light Observations, NLE Choppa, Matt Maeson.

External links 
Music Farm

The ' original ' Music Farm opened in April, 1991, on East Bay Street. From his experience as a musician and as a member of a band that had toured the Southeast, Kevin Wadley wanted a venue that focused on music, not just another nightclub. Wadley originated the name and concept for Music Farm. He asked Carter McMillan to partner in the business, whose background in radio and promotion enabled them to create a dynamic nightspot which quickly became known throughout the Southeast as "the place" to hear good music.
 The Music Farm marks 15 years at the center of Charleston's Music Scene
 Concert promoters hope to grow success at renovated Music Farm

In late September 2007 the Music Farm was purchased by John Ellison of Charlotte, NC and Marshall Lowe of Charleston, SC.  Ellison, who also owns Amos' Southend in Charlotte and Lowe, one-third of the promotional company All In Entertainment, have made several renovations to the club including the addition of a new sound and lighting system, an expansion the balcony, and a complete remodeling of the bathrooms.  The club underwent a month of renovation and reopened on Oct 28th with The Avett Brothers.

 http://www.charlestonmag.com/charleston_magazine/feature/farmers_almanac

The Music Farm in Columbia, SC opened in September 2014 (8 years ago) on Senate St. In 2014 it hosted Corey Smith (from GA), Washed Out (from GA), Hunter Hayes, The Revivalists, Sister Hazel (from Gainesville), Pop Evil, Atlas Road Crew (from Cola.), Sevendust (from ATL), Breathe Carolina, O.A.R., Bone Thugs-N-Harmony (from Cleveland), and Chevelle. In 2015 it hosted G-Eazy, Brett Eldredge, Waka Flocka Flame (from ATL), Hollywood Undead, The Movement (from Cola.), Vanilla Ice, Migos (from ATL), Butch Walker (from ATL), Yelawolf, Toro y Moi (from Cola.), Raekwon & Ghostface Killah, American Authors and Andy Grammer, Against Me!, Hinder, Young the Giant, 10 Years with Nonpoint, Kaleo, Collective Soul (from ATL), Slightly Stoopid, Big K.R.I.T., Mystikal and Juvenile, Third Eye Blind (dedicated a song to the '15 Columbia flood), Kevin Gates, Parmalee (from NC), and Jump, Little Children (from Charleston). In 2016 it hosted Saving Abel, Ying Yang Twins (from ATL), The Wailers, Cowboy Mouth, Corinne Bailey Rae, Blue October, Trevor Hall (from Hilton Head), and Nappy Roots. In 2017, it hosted Atlanta rapper 21 Savage, Cold War Kids, JoJo, UK's Flux Pavilion, Kane Brown, Asheville's Luke Combs, J. Cole (from NC), Umphrey's McGee, Judah & the Lion, Manchester Orchestra (from ATL), Spoon, Matisyahu, Florida's New Found Glory, Aaron Carter, Susto from Charleston, Josh Turner from Florence for an Xmas show, and many classic rock tribute bands (to Led Zep (Zoso), Beatles, Rolling Stones, The Police (for the '17 Eclipse; tribute from Columbia), Prince, Chili Peppers, 311, Foo Fighters (Hey Johnny Park! tribute from Columbia), Nirvana, Grateful Dead (Cosmic Charlie), Georgia's Widespread Panic, etc.). In 2018, it hosted St. Paul & The Broken Bones (from Alabama), In this Moment with P.O.D., a chili cookoff in February, Flogging Molly, Miami DJ Diplo, BANFF Mountain Film Festival, All Time Low (from Maryland), A Boogie wit da Hoodie, Rainbow Kitten Surprise from Boone, NC, Toad the Wet Sprocket, The Breeders, Cannibal Corpse, and Lauv. The Music Farm in Columbia changed its name to The Senate in May 2018. In 2019, it hosted the country Eli Young Band, Coheed and Cambria from New York, SOJA, Stephen Marley, Moon Taxi from Alabama, Elle King (from Ohio) with Barns Courtney, UK's Ella Mai, Georgia's Lauren Alaina, Gin Blossoms, Badflower, and Loud Luxury EDM duo. In early 2020 before COVID-19, it hosted Rock Hill's Emery with Ohio's Hawthorne Heights, Indigo Girls (from ATL), Buckcherry, and Fitz and the Tantrums. Grouplove's 2020 show at The Senate was cancelled due to COVID-19. The Senate's last concert in 2020 before COVID-19 hit was a St. Pat's Block Party with Parmalee on March 14. The Senate then didn't host any concerts (due to Gov. McMaster closing all music venues in SC due to COVID-19) until October 2, 2020, when it hosted the Johnny Cash tribute show. Also in October 2020, The Senate hosted an Allman Bros Tribute band, and the Columbia-based Ozzy Osbourne tribute band (for Halloween). Concertgoers were seated at tables of 4 and 6 for these tribute shows. The first well known national band to play at The Senate (that wasn't a tribute band) after COVID was Cracker on June 25, 2021. Cali's P.O.D. returned to The Senate on September 25, 2021. Mammoth WVH and Candlebox also played in September. 90s band Everclear played there on October 9, and rapper Tech N9ne performed there in November. Atlanta rapper Big Boi's concert in 2021 was cancelled. Texas band Reverend Horton Heat performed there in March 2022, and Lukas Nelson (Willie's son) performed in April. Columbia's hardcore punk band Stretch Arm Strong played in April. Comedian Chelcie Lynn and Poppy performed there in May 2022. August Burns Red (singer from Columbia), rapper KB, Tai Verdes, and Duane Betts played there in 2022.

Music venues in South Carolina
Buildings and structures in Charleston, South Carolina